The Great Swamp National Wildlife Refuge is located in Morris County, New Jersey. Established in 1960, it is among what has grown to be more than 550 refuges in the United States National Wildlife Refuge System. 

The first part of the Great Swamp that was assembled and donated for perpetual preservation by the park service of the federal government was declared a National Natural Landmark in May 1966. More land has been added several times. Its eastern half was designated as a wilderness by Congress in 1968, making it the first wilderness area within the Fish and Wildlife Service.

Since about 1966, it has been managed by the Morris County Park Commission.

Administration

The refuge is managed by the United States Fish and Wildlife Service, an agency within the United States Department of the Interior. Refuge lands lie within the townships of Chatham, Harding, and Long Hill.

History

Geologic

The Great Swamp is the remnant of the bottom of the once-mighty Glacial Lake Passaic that approximately 15,000 to 11,000 years ago stretched across  in what is presently northern New Jersey. The lake was formed by the melting waters of the retreating Wisconsin Glacier at the end of the last ice age. The glacier had pushed a moraine ahead of its advance, a rubble of soil and rocks that plugged the existing outlet for the waters that drained into the area of the watershed. As the retreating glacier melted, the waters rose to create the lake before a new outlet began to allow the water to exit at a much higher elevation.

The plug altered the course of the Passaic River, which had drained a swamp that predated the lake. A range of mountains to the west of Morristown formed the western boundary of the new lake and the most easterly line of the Watchung Mountains became the eastern boundary. The tops of some of the Watchung range became islands in the great lake. Water that had vented through the Watchung range, or to its south, found a new path that altered the old drainage paths. When the plug collapsed, the river still was forced to travel north through the range before finding a new outlet near present-day Paterson where it could manage the eastern turn toward the sea.

Early settlers
Some ten thousand years ago, Amerindians arrived in the area and established settlements shortly after the retreat of the glacier, hunting, fishing, and farming. In 1614, Dutch colonists claimed part of the area as New Netherlands and they traded with the natives. Later, British settlers came, establishing dominion over what they called the Province of New Jersey.

The refuge includes about one-quarter of the Great Swamp  watershed that gives rise to the Passaic River. The watershed touches ten modern communities, many of which were settled by European colonists long before the American Revolution.

Wildlife Refuge formation

The land that would become the Great Swamp National Wildlife Refuge was established by an Act of Congress on November 3, 1960, after a year-long legal battle that pitted local residents against Port Authority of New York and New Jersey officials wishing to turn the Great Swamp into a major regional airport to supplement Newark Airport's ability to accommodate large jet aircraft.

The Jersey Jetport Site Association was the first to form in opposition. Their efforts to prevent the development of an airport in the swamp became public knowledge on December 3, 1959, when four of its members (Kafi Benz, Joan Kelly, Esty Weiss, and Betty White) were expelled from a meeting at the Essex House in Newark that had been organized to generate support for its construction. The JJSA activity was followed closely by an influential sister organization when (because of connections with Marcellus Hartley Dodge, Sr., a major donor to and participant in JJSA) the North American Wildlife Foundation established its specially designated, Great Swamp Committee, in 1960. Between the two organizations and, in less than a year, enough property in the core of the swamp was quickly purchased, assembled, and donated to the federal government to qualify for perpetual protection as a National Wildlife Refuge. As the representative from Arizona, Stewart Udall immediately championed the efforts of these residents, whom he described as having mounted the greatest effort ever made by residents in America to protect a natural habitat, and later, on May 29, 1964, as the Secretary of the Interior, he oversaw its dedication as a refuge. In 1960, Representative Peter Frelinghuysen, Jr., whose estate was in the area targeted for development also joined the effort.

Description

It lies within the Northeastern coastal forests ecoregion. When the remainder of the area donated was dedicated on September 9, 1968, it was the first refuge to receive wilderness designation.

The Great Swamp is a migration-resting and feeding area or a permanent habitat for more than 244 species of birds. The major routes of birds migrating along the eastern portion of the United States follow the corridor that includes the Great Swamp as an important stopping place for rest and nutrition.

Many species of birds reside permanently in the watershed. Deer, fish, fox, frogs, muskrat, raccoons, snakes, turtles, as well as many insects and a wide variety of wildflowers and plants call the refuge "home". Some of the animals hunted by the prehistoric native inhabitants and colonists, such as bear and beaver, are encountered occasionally. Its role in draining the region and absorbing flood water for gradual release can be critical during extreme weather conditions. The refuge also plays an important role in improving water quality by acting as a natural ecological filter trapping sediments and contaminants.

Related organizations

Numerous nonprofit organizations have arisen from the communities within the Great Swamp watershed and work closely in partnership with the refuge. The Great Swamp Watershed Association, founded in 1981, works to protect the entire  watershed that surrounds the swamp. Within the Great Swamp there also is a nonprofit bird-rehabilitation center founded in 1977, called The Raptor Trust, mainly specializing in birds of prey, such as eagles, hawks, and owls. Lord Stirling Park is part of the Somerset County Park System. The park is entered from the community of Stirling that is named after a military officer of the American Revolution who lived in the community, William Alexander. The park is located immediately adjacent to the southwestern boundary of the refuge on the west side of the Passaic River. The park offers excellent hiking facilities that include trails, boardwalks, observation blinds, and naturalist exhibits displayed in its park office that are related to the swamp and its wildlife.

Gallery

See also 
National Wildlife Refuge
United States Fish and Wildlife Service
Saving The Great Swamp — a documentary about the struggle to preserve the refuge from the New York Port Authority's attempts to build an airport on the site between 1959 and 1968.
 Plotch, Philip M. and Jen Nelles, Mobilizing the Metropolis: How the Port Authority Built New York (University of Michigan Press, 2023) - This book chronicles the Port Authority's hubris and arrogance in the face of a united community opposed to the jetport.

References

External links

U.S. Fish and Wildlife Service: Great Swamp National Wildlife Refuge
Friends of the Great Swamp
Great Swamp Watershed Association
New Jersey's Great Northwest Skylands: The Great Swamp
Ten Towns Great Swamp Watershed Management Committee
Great Swamp National Wildlife Refuge Trail Details and Info

Long Hill Township, New Jersey
National Wildlife Refuges in New Jersey
Protected areas of Morris County, New Jersey
Passaic River
Swamps of New Jersey
National Natural Landmarks in New Jersey
Protected areas established in 1960
Watchung Mountains
Wetlands of New Jersey
Landforms of Morris County, New Jersey